"Just Like Jesse James" is a song recorded by American singer and actress Cher for her nineteenth album Heart of Stone (1989). It was released as the third North American and second European single in October 1989, by Geffen Records. The song was written by Desmond Child and Diane Warren, and produced by Child. It was a December 1989 top-ten hit. The song's title is a reference to legendary Wild West bandit Jesse James. The title phrase previously appeared in Linda Ronstadt’s hit “Poor Poor Pitiful Me”.

Song information
"Just Like Jesse James" peaked at No. 8 on the Billboard Hot 100 chart in December 1989, becoming Cher's third top ten single from Heart of Stone in the US. It also peaked at No. 9 on the Billboard Adult Contemporary chart. The song was released in the UK in December 1989 and peaked at No. 11 on the UK Singles Chart in February 1990.

Cher has stated during concert performances that she personally never much liked the song despite its successful chart performance.

Critical reception
AllMusic's Gary Hill later noted that this song isn't like the rest of the songs on the album, and called it an "effective ballad." The Daily Vault's Mark Millan described it as "country-tinged", adding that Cher "clearly reveled in singing, and although it's very 'wordy,' it recalls the days when Cher had great success in recording songs that told a story like 'Half-Breed', 'Dark Lady,' and 'Gypsies, Tramps And Thieves'." David Giles from Music Week commented that it's "a better song than If I Could Turn Back Time. This is Cher in her 'no nonsense' frame of mind as she lambasts her man. Forceful and dramatic; another big hit."

Live performances
Cher performed the song on the following concert tours:
 Heart of Stone Tour (only for a rehearsal)
 Love Hurts Tour
 Do You Believe? Tour
 The Farewell Tour (sung on the first leg, the second leg and the final two shows of the tour)
 Dressed to Kill Tour

Track listing
US and European 7" and cassette single
"Just Like Jesse James" – 4:06
"Starting Over" – 4:09

European 12" and CD single
"Just Like Jesse James" – 4:06
"I Found Someone" – 3:42
"Starting Over" – 4:09

Personnel
Cher: Vocals
Brenda Russell, Desmond Child, Diane Warren: Backing Vocals
John McCurry, John Putnam: Electric and Acoustic Guitars
Alan St. Jon: Keyboards
Hugh McDonald: Bass
Bobby Chouinard: Drums, Percussion

Production
Arranged and Produced by Desmond Child
Recorded by Sir Arthur Payson; assisted by Bruce Robb
Mixed by Mick Guzauski
Mastered by Dan Hersch; supervised by David Donnelly
Published by Desmobile Music Co. Inc./SBK April Music Inc./Realsongs

Charts and certifications

Weekly charts

Year-end charts

Certifications and sales

References

External links
Official Cher site
ASCAP

Songs about Jesse James
1980s ballads
1989 singles
Cher songs
Songs written by Desmond Child
James–Younger Gang
Songs written by Diane Warren
Rock ballads
1989 songs
Geffen Records singles
Song recordings produced by Desmond Child
Articles containing video clips